The 1927 New South Wales state election to elect the 90 members of the 28th Legislative Assembly was held on 8 October 1927. During the previous parliament the voting system, which had been a form of proportional representation with multi-member seats and a single transferable vote (modified Hare-Clark), was changed to single member constituencies with optional preferential voting. Severe divisions occurred within the Labor Party caucus in the four months prior to the election (see Lang Labor) and a caretaker government composed of the supporters of the Premier of New South Wales and party leader, Jack Lang was in power at the time of the election.

As a result of the election the Lang government was defeated and a Nationalist/Country Party coalition government led by Thomas Bavin and Ernest Buttenshaw was formed with a parliamentary majority of 1 and the usual support of the 2 Nationalist independents. The Parliament first met on 3 November 1927, and ran its maximum term of 3 years. Lang remained the leader of the Labor Party throughout the Parliament.

To date Lang is the only elected Labor Premier of New South Wales to be voted out of office.

Key dates

Results

{{Australian elections/Title row
| table style = float:right;clear:right;margin-left:1em;
	| title			= New South Wales state election, 29 October 1927
	| house			= Legislative Assembly
	| series		= New South Wales state election
	| back			= 1925
	| forward		= 1930
	| enrolled		= 1,394,254
	| total_votes	= 1,150,767
	| turnout %		= 82.54
	| turnout chg	= +13.47
	| informal		= 15,086
	| informal %	= 1.31
	| informal chg	= –2.06
}}

|}

Changing seats

See also 
 Candidates of the 1927 New South Wales state election
 Members of the New South Wales Legislative Assembly, 1927–1930

Notes

References

Elections in New South Wales
New South Wales state election
1920s in New South Wales
New South Wales state election